This is a list of grand masters of the Knights Hospitaller, including its continuation as the Sovereign Military Order of Malta after 1798. It also includes unrecognized "anti-grand masters" and lieutenants or stewards during vacancies.

In lists of the heads of the Order, the title "Grand Master" is often applied retrospectively to the early heads of the Order. The medieval heads of the Order used the title of custos (Guardian) of the hospital. The title magister (Master) is used on coins minted in Rhodes, beginning with Foulques de Villaret. The first to use the title Grandis Magister (Grand Master) was Jean de Lastic (reigned 1437–1454). Later Grand Masters in Rhodes used Magnus Magister (Grand Master). 

In 1607 the Holy Roman Emperor Rudolf II created the Grand Master a Prince of the Holy Roman Empire (Reichsfürst).  This grant was renewed by the Holy Roman Emperor Ferdinand II on July 16, 1620.  On March 20, 1607, Pope Paul V granted the Grand Master the style of His Eminence and precedence at the Court of Rome immediately after the cardinals.

In 1880 the title of Fürst (Prince) was recognised in Austria by the Emperor Franz Joseph I.

On February 2, 1929, the title of Principe (Prince) and the style of Altezza Eminentissima (Most Eminent Highness) were recognised in Italy by King Victor Emmanuel III.

The style currently used by the Grand Master is:
 ,
 ,
 ,
 ,
 .

Numbered lists of the heads of the Order were published beginning in the early 17th century, with updated editions appearing throughout the 18th century. The numbering of Masters and Grand Masters published in the 1719 Statutes of the Order lists Blessed Gerard as founder without number, Raymond du Puy as 1st Master, and Ramón Perellós (the incumbent as of 1719) as 63rd Grand Master. The numbering currently used by the Sovereign Military Order of Malta lists Blessed Gerard as 1st Master, Raymond du Puy as 2nd Master, Ramón Perellós y Rocafull as 64th Grand Master, and Giacomo Dalla Torre del Tempio di Sanguinetto as 80th Grand Master.

Knights Hospitaller (Kingdom of Jerusalem)

Knights of Rhodes

Knights of Malta

Sovereign Military Order of Malta

See also
 Grand master (order)
 Order of Saint John (Bailiwick of Brandenburg)#Herrenmeister
 Grand Masters and Lieutenancies of the Order of the Holy Sepulchre
 Grand Master of the Teutonic Order
 Grand Masters of the Order of Saint Lazarus
 List of grand masters of the Knights Templar
 List of heads of state of Malta

References 

 Robert Morris, Coins of the grand masters of the Order of Malta: or Knights Hospitallers of St. John of Jerusalem (1884).

External links
Official site list of Grand Masters
Official site description of the Lieutenant of the Grand Master

 
 
Knights Hospitaller
Hospitaller
Lists of princes
Religion and politics